The Napf is a mountain on the border between the Swiss cantons of Bern and Lucerne. It is counted geologically as part of the Swiss plateau, although it is sometimes considered part of the Emmental Alps. The region is bounded by the Emmental to the south-west and the Entlebuch to the east. The region is traversed by the Brünig-Napf-Reuss line.

The peak is surrounded by steep hills that are a patchwork of evergreen forests and small mountain farms. Nearby towns include Romoos, Doppleschwand, Michlischwand, Luthern, and Menzberg.

Climate

See also
List of mountains of Switzerland
List of most isolated mountains of Switzerland

References

External links

 Napf on Hikr
 Napf Hotel

Mountains of Switzerland
Mountains of the canton of Bern
Mountains of the canton of Lucerne
Bern–Lucerne border
Mountains of the Alps
One-thousanders of Switzerland